Vincenzo Borghini (29 October 1515 – 15 August 1580) was an Italian monk, artist, philologist, and art collector of  Florence, Italy.

Borghini was a learned Benedictine cleric. He was the luogotenente of the Accademia del Disegno (from 1563).

After 1552, Borghini, a Benedictine monk served as Spedalingo or Prior of the Ospedale degli Innocenti in Florence.

He was an artistic advisor to the Medici, and was engaged with Giorgio Vasari in designing and selecting the decoration of the Studiolo of Francesco I Medici in the Palazzo Vecchio of Florence.

References

External links 
 

1515 births
1580 deaths
Italian art collectors
Italian Christian monks
Italian philologists
Religious leaders from Florence